The Gibraltarian records in swimming are the fastest ever performances of swimmers from Gibraltar, which are recognised and ratified by the Gibraltar Amateur Swimming Association (GASA).

All records were set in finals unless noted otherwise.

Long Course (50 m)

Men

|-bgcolor=#DDDDDD
|colspan=9|
|-

|-bgcolor=#DDDDDD
|colspan=9|
|-

|-bgcolor=#DDDDDD
|colspan=9|
|-

|-bgcolor=#DDDDDD
|colspan=9|
|-

|-bgcolor=#DDDDDD
|colspan=9|
|-

Women

|-bgcolor=#DDDDDD
|colspan=9|
|-

|-bgcolor=#DDDDDD
|colspan=9|
|-

|-bgcolor=#DDDDDD
|colspan=9|
|-

|-bgcolor=#DDDDDD
|colspan=9|
|-

|-bgcolor=#DDDDDD
|colspan=9|
|-

Short Course (25 m)

Men

|-bgcolor=#DDDDDD
|colspan=9|
|-

|-bgcolor=#DDDDDD
|colspan=9|
|-

|-bgcolor=#DDDDDD
|colspan=9|
|-

|-bgcolor=#DDDDDD
|colspan=9|
|-

|-bgcolor=#DDDDDD
|colspan=9|
|-

Women

|-bgcolor=#DDDDDD
|colspan=9|
|-

|-bgcolor=#DDDDDD
|colspan=9|
|-

|-bgcolor=#DDDDDD
|colspan=9|
|-

|-bgcolor=#DDDDDD
|colspan=9|
|-

|-bgcolor=#DDDDDD
|colspan=9|
|-

Mixed relay

References

External links
GASA official website

Gibraltar
Records